NGC 6357 is a diffuse nebula near NGC 6334 in the constellation Scorpius.  The nebula contains many proto-stars shielded by dark discs of gas, and young stars wrapped in expanding "cocoons" or expanding gases surrounding these small stars. It is also known as the Lobster Nebula. This nebula was given the name War and Peace Nebula by the Midcourse Space Experiment scientists because of its appearance, which, in infrared images the bright, western part resembles a dove, while the eastern part looks like a skull. A petition by anime fans to rename it as the Madokami nebula, due to resemblance with a character, did not prosper.

It is located about ~5,500 light years away from Earth.

Associated open clusters

Pismis 24

This nebula includes the open cluster Pismis 24, which is home to several massive stars. One of the brightest stars in the cluster, Pismis 24-1, was thought possibly to be the most massive on record, approaching 300 solar masses, until it was discovered to be a multiple system of at least three stars; component stars would still remain near 100 solar masses each, making them among the more massive stars on record.

G353.2+0.7

The young stellar cluster G353.2+0.7 lies east of Pismis 24 and was revealed by a Chandra X-ray image showing approximately 800 stars.

G353.1+0.6

The young stellar cluster G353.1+0.6 lies southeast of Pismis 24 and also contains approximately 800 stars detected by X-ray. The region includes several O-type stars, including [BDSB2003] 10.

Massive stars

NGC 6357 is one of the most prominent sites of massive-star formation in our neighborhood of the Milky Way. A variety of early O-type stars reside in this nebula, blowing the bubbles around the star clusters that can be seen in the molecular cloud.

References

External links

European Southern Observatory infrared image
Slate blog about the nebula
APOD Pictures:

 Star Forming Region NGC 6357 showing complex interactions between interstellar winds, radiation pressures and magnetic fields.
 A Massive Star in NGC 6357 with a close-up of Pismis 24.
 NGC 6357: Cathedral to Massive Stars
 A Massive Star in NGC 6357
 NGC 6357: Cathedral to Massive Stars
 NGC 6357: The Lobster Nebula

H II regions
Scorpius (constellation)
6357
Sharpless objects
Star-forming regions